Ibn al-Haytham may refer to: 

 Hasan ibn al-Haytham, 11th-century mathematician and astronomer known as "Alhazen"
 Abu Abdullah Ja'far ibn al-Aswad ibn al-Haytham, 10th-century Isma'ili da'i from Qayrawan